David Andrew Elliott (born 11 June 1970) is an Australian politician. Elliott has served as the New South Wales Minister for Transport and the Minister for Veterans in the Perrottet ministry since 21 December 2021. Elliott is a member of the New South Wales Legislative Assembly representing Baulkham Hills for the Liberal Party since 2011.

Elliott served as the Minister for Police and Emergency Services between April 2019 and December 2021 in the second Berejiklian ministry and the first arrangement of the Perrottet ministry. Elliott was Minister for Counter Terrorism from January 2017 until March 2019 and Minister for Corrections and Minister for Veterans Affairs from April 2015 until March 2019 in the first Berejiklian ministry. He was Minister for Emergency Services between 2015 and 2017 in the second Baird government.

Early years and background
In 1995, Elliott joined the Australian Army and commenced his officer training at Royal Military College, Duntroon, attaining the rank of Captain in April 1997. Taking 18 months' leave, he worked as Press Secretary for the Hon. Peter Collins, QC MP who was elected NSW Leader of the Opposition following the 1995 state election. During 1999, Elliott was Director for the Australians for Constitutional Monarchy campaign against the referendum for Australia to become a republic; for which he was awarded the Centenary Medal on 1 January 2001 for service to the constitutional reform debate.

Returning to the Army in 2000, Elliott served in peace-keeping forces in Bouganville, Papua New Guinea and was awarded the Australian Service Medal. For the next four years, Elliott worked as state operations manager in St John Ambulance (NSW), before commencing as Executive Officer of the Australian Hotels Association, and later becoming Deputy chief executive officer. In 2008, Elliott became chief executive officer of the Civil Contractors Federation and held this position until his election to Parliament.

Elliott was a director of Castle Hill RSL Club Limited from 2009 to 2016. Elliott was a director of Life Education Australia between 2009 and 2011, and a member of Sydney Chamber of Commerce from 2008 to 2011. Between 1992 and 2001, he has held a range of Liberal Party elected positions.

Political career
On 16 June 2007, Elliott sought Liberal Party pre-selection for the federal seat of Mitchell, but lost by a margin of 20 votes to 81 against Alex Hawke, then an advisor to Ray Williams MP. Paul Blanch, a grazier from Orange, received 8 votes. Alan Cadman, who had been the member for Mitchell since 1974, chose not to contest the pre-selection, but was later quoted as saying that this was due to "relentless branch-stacking within the electorate." In February 2010, Elliott unsuccessfully sought Liberal Party pre-selection for the Legislative Council of New South Wales in a bitter and public battle with David Clarke, a member of the Liberal's so called 'religious right' faction.

Following the announcement of the retirement of sitting Liberal member, Wayne Merton, Elliott won party pre-selection for the NSW seat of Baulkham Hills, running against Baulkham Hills Councillor Mike Thomas and solicitor Damien Tudehope. At the 2011 election, Elliott was elected to the safe Liberal seat with a swing of 14.4 points and won the seat with 76.4 per cent of the two-party vote. Elliott's main opponent was Tony Hay, representing Labor.

Following the 2015 state election, Elliott was sworn in as the Minister for Emergency Services, the Minister for Corrections, and the Minister for Veterans Affairs in the second Baird government. On 30 January 2017, Elliott was sworn in as the Minister for Counter-Terrorism, the Minister for Corrections, and the Minister for Veterans Affairs in the first Berejiklian ministry.

On 18 October 2018 Elliott used parliamentary privilege in the Legislative Assembly to raise an allegation that Luke Foley, at the time leader of the opposition, had "a little bit too much to drink at a party and harassed an ABC journalist." Later that month, ABC journalist Ashleigh Raper released a statement, alleging that at an event in November 2016, Foley "placed his hand down the back of her dress and inside her underpants." Hours later, Foley read a statement in which he resigned as leader of the Labor Party, but denied the allegation and said he would commence defamation proceedings in the Federal Court.

Following the 2019 state election, Elliott was sworn in as the Minister for Police and Emergency Services in the second Berejiklian ministry, with effect from 2 April 2019. He served in this role in the first arrangement of the Perrottet ministry and was sworn in as Minister for Transport and Minister for Veterans in December 2021 in the second arrangement of the ministry.

On 23 October 2022, Elliott announced he will not be contesting the 2023 state election.

Controversies 
In November 2019, Elliott was cleared by police following an investigation into an alleged road rage incident involving a 17-year-old P-plate driver. Elliot had told the P-plate driver he "worked for the cops".

Also in November 2019, Elliott responded to revelations police strip-searched 122 girls by stating he would want officers to search his own children if "they were at risk of doing something wrong".

In December 2019, he attracted attention for an offensive post on Facebook, in which he told a "mate" that he'd "rip your head off and s--- in the hole".

In December 2019, Elliott was denounced for deciding to take a holiday to Europe during the Black Summer bushfires, one of the worst bushfire disasters in the country's history. He faced heavy criticism because of his role as New South Wales Emergency Services Minister, with New South Wales being by far the worst-hit area of the country, with bushfires throughout NSW destroying almost a thousand houses and killing or displacing a billion animals, with nine people killed, including three firefighters. He was not helped by the fact that just a week earlier, the federal Liberal Party leader and prime minister, Scott Morrison, faced similar criticism for going on a holiday to Hawaii.

Elliott responded to the claims by saying he would keep bushfire-affected communities and firefighters in his thoughts while on holiday. After public pressure and criticism following catastrophic fires on 31 December 2019, Elliott "apparently" backflipped and returned home from his European trip.

On 9 March 2020, the NSW Police announced an investigation into whether Elliott's use of highly restricted firearms broke the law.

On 21 February 2022, the passenger rail network in NSW was shutdown after Transport for NSW and the RTBU failed to reach an agreement in their ongoing enterprise agreement negotiations. This shutdown was particularly noteworthy as it occurred on the same day that Australia's international border reopened (after being closed for two years in response to the COVID-19 pandemic). 

As Minister for Transport, Elliott attracted criticism for appearing to be unaware of the sequence of events which led to the shutdown, accusing the RTBU of engaging in "terrorist-like activity", and for claiming that he did not know a shutdown would occur until the morning of Monday 21 February as he would have been asleep by 10pm the previous night. 

Following the handling of the shutdown, Elliott was rebuked by Premier Perrottet who stated “My expectation is that ministers are available around the clock. I certainly am, and I expect the same of my ministers”. 

In January 2023, Elliott revealed that he had tipped off Perrottet about the existence of evidence of him wearing a Nazi uniform to his 21st birthday.

Honours and awards

References

 

Australian monarchists
Liberal Party of Australia members of the Parliament of New South Wales
Members of the New South Wales Legislative Assembly
Living people
1970 births
Royal Military College, Duntroon graduates
Australian Army officers
Western Sydney University alumni
University of New England (Australia) alumni
Charles Sturt University alumni
21st-century Australian politicians